Thajiwara is a village in South kashmir in the Anantnag district of the Indian union territory of Jammu and Kashmir. It is located on National Highway 244 (NH 244).

Geography 
It is located 7 km north of District headquarters Anantnag, 1.03 km from Achabal and 52 km from the State capital Srinagar. The area of the village is 117 hectares. Arpat canal is famous for trout fish. On its bank is Shah I Hamdan Stadium. The people in Thajiwara appear in sports such as cricket, football and volleyball among others.

Demographics
In the 2011 census, the population was 1,847 people in 258 houses.

Culture 
A shrine of Amir Kabir (RT) and Baba Lasham Reshi (RT) is present in Thajiwara.

Economy 
Agriculture and allied services form the backbone of the economy, featuring orchards.

Education 
The village has six government aided schools and a Wakf-aided private school.

Transport
Sadura Railway Station and Anantnag Railway Station are the nearest railway stations.

References

Villages in Anantnag district